The Catcher is a 1998 American slasher film directed by Guy Crawford and Yvette Hoffman.

Plot 

Sick of his baseball-obsessed father Frank's abuse, a boy beats him to death with a bat while practicing in 1981. Seventeen years later, catcher David J. Walker of The Devils is kicked out of a baseball game attended by scouts, and is blamed when The Devils lose. On the same day, David's girlfriend leaves, tired of him putting his love of baseball before her, and he is informed by Coach Foster that his contract is not being renewed.

Elsewhere, in a stadium locker room, Tyrone Jackson of The Wombats, who had just scored a major contract, is bludgeoned by someone wearing a catcher's uniform. Tyrone's assailant proceeds to delete David's file from the Devils' computer system, which they infect with a virus. The catcher's next victim is Devils player, and assistant coach Terry's fiancé Billy. He is taped onto a table, and is sodomized with a baseball bat. Out on the field, one of the commentators notices the catcher taking swings at non-existent balls, drilled by visions of Frank, who calls the catcher "Johnny". When the announcer goes to investigate, he is incapacitated, tied down to home plate, and killed when Johnny runs the bases, and kicks him in the head as he slides into home.

In her office, Terry notices that her computer has made a list (everyone killed by Johnny so far) and that it is typing out more names on its own. David drops by to deal with paperwork related to his dismissal, but since the computer system is down and the antivirus program will take a while to fix it, he and Terry go to a lunchroom being cleaned by the janitor, Carl. David's erratic behavior causes Terry to storm back to her office, where the computer still refuses to work. Carl barges in, and leads Terry and David to a large amount of blood he has found. David takes off, so Terry has Carl pursue him, but the custodian loses the ex-catcher, and returns to Terry.

At the batting cages, Coach Foster is strung up and shot to death with a pitching machine. Johnny then goes to the field, and finds Devils player Anthony making out with a woman. Johnny snaps Anthony's neck, and gives chase to the girlfriend, stuffing her into a washing machine when she is cornered in the laundry room.

As that occurs, Carl tells Terry that it is the anniversary of the day Johnny McIntosh (the boy from the intro) bludgeoned his father, and that when Johnny was arrested he swore he would one day return. Terry dismisses Carl's story, until the two find Billy's body. The duo goes to look for David, and find him in the batting cages with Coach Foster's corpse. The two are convinced that David is the killer, and try to escape through the front gate, but David catches up to them, and a fight breaks out between him and Carl. David knocks Carl out, takes his keys, and chases after Terry, with the two of them encountering Johnny, who kills Carl.

Terry and David flee, but Johnny catches them, knocks them unconscious, and places them on the field, which has been decorated with the bodies of all the male victims. A bat-wielding Johnny enters the field (which he hallucinates is full of spectators and players) and goes to home base, where David is bound and dressed like a catcher. Johnny forces Terry to be his pitcher, hits the third ball she throws, and drags her along as he runs the bases, distracting him and allowing David time to escape his binds. David and Johnny (who are dressed identically) fight, and Terry stabs one of them with a splintered bat, realizing too late it was David. As Johnny strangles Terry, she is saved by Anthony's girlfriend, and together the two bash Johnny's head in.

Cast 
 David Heavener as David J. Walker
 Monique Parent as Terry Mitchell
 Joe Estevez as Frank McIntosh
 Sean J. Dillingham as Carl
 Leslie Garret as Beth
 Paul Moncrief as Billy Taylor
 James Patterson as Coach Red Foster
 Harley Harkins as Anthony
 Jeff Sorenson as Wayne Futzner
 Mike Kepple as Howie
 Fred Meyers as Young Johnny McIntosh
 Wendy Crawford as Phyllis McIntosh
 Nick Moore as Tyrone Jackson
 Denice Ramage as Linda
 Stephen T. Vanderbeck as Frost
 Jared Zobel as Paperboy

Reception 

Big Daddy's Horror Review gave The Catcher one star, and described it as lazy and incompetent. The film was held in similar disdain by Vegan Voorhees, which awarded it a half-star, and criticized the plot, acting, editing, and gore effects. A Slash Above had a lukewarm reaction to The Catcher, writing that while the death scenes and mystery angle were fun and the direction was decent, the story, editing, lighting, score, and sound mixing left a lot to be desired.

References

External links 
 

1998 films
1998 horror films
1998 independent films
1990s sports films
American slasher films
Films set in 1981
Films set in 1998
American baseball films
Films set in California
American independent films
Films about domestic violence
1998 directorial debut films
1990s English-language films
1990s American films